Dokuchayevsky is a rural locality (a settlement) in Voznesenskoye Rural Settlement, Talovsky District, Voronezh Oblast, Russia. The population was 342 as of 2010. There are 2 streets.

References 

Rural localities in Talovsky District